Rakesh Chandra Shukla  (4 February 1948 – 29 June 2019) was an Indian cricketer.

Career 
A modest debut and a number of exceptional innings marked Shukla's cricket career, which was interspersed with some robust all-round show that gave him a distinct identity among the top spinners of the country. He was a leg-spinner who loved the googly more than the traditional line of attack which he was quite adept at. At his best, on slightly helpful pitches, the ball would whizz past the off-stump after beginning the arc from outside leg.

Born in Kanpur, Shukla was seven years younger than  his brother Anand Shukla, another leg-break bowler and handy batsman who played domestic cricket for a long time. A study of the careers of the two brothers will reveal how close their records have been. Anand's numbers are better, but that has a lot to do with the fact that he played for Uttar Pradesh and Bihar, which were in the weaker zones of the Ranji Trophy.

Shukla played for Hartlepool Cricket Club in the North Yorkshire and South Durham Cricket League. He took 61 wickets and scored over 1,300 runs in 1982 to help the club win the league. While still in England, he was selected in the Indian Test team to play against Sri Lanka in Madras. Shukla went wicketless in the first innings. In the second he dismissed the two highest scorers - Roy Dias (97) edged to Sunil Gavaskar at slip after misreading a googly, and Duleep Mendis (105) was bowled.

After he quit cricket Shukla became a cricket consultant, providing coaching and guidance to young players and professionals. He was a member of the Delhi Selection Committee headed by Chetan Chauhan. He was also a popular commentator on All India Radio.

References

External links
 
 "Rakesh Shukla: A Ranji Trophy stalwart"

1948 births
2019 deaths
India Test cricketers
Indian cricketers
North Zone cricketers
East Zone cricketers
Sportspeople from Kanpur
Cricketers from Uttar Pradesh
Durham cricketers
Delhi cricketers
Bengal cricketers
Indian cricket coaches